"Walkin' Shoes" is a jazz composition by Gerry Mulligan. He recorded it with Chet Baker in 1952. It has been cited as one of Mulligan's most popular compositions. The construction is AABA.

References

1950s jazz standards
1952 songs